The Battle of Coffrane took place on February 28, 1296, about 1 km to the east of Coffrane in the canton of Neuchâtel. The Lords of Valangin with support from the Bishop of Basel rebelled against the Count of Neuchâtel. The battle was fought in the Val-de-Ruz, next to the village of Coffrane. The Count of Neuchâtel, Rollin, won the battle.

References

1296 in Europe
Coffrane
Coffrane
13th century in Switzerland
Coffrane